Papaipema araliae, known generally as the aralia shoot borer moth or hedge veronica, is a species of cutworm or dart moth in the family Noctuidae. It is found in North America.

The MONA or Hodges number for Papaipema araliae is 9470.

References

Further reading

 
 
 

Papaipema
Articles created by Qbugbot
Moths described in 1921